was a Japanese samurai of the late Edo period, who served as the last daimyō of Fukuoka han. He was adopted into the family and was born as Tatewaka (建若), the second son of Tōdō Takayuki, lord of the Tsu han. A pro-Chōshū figure during the tumultuous Bakumatsu era, he allied with the new government in the Boshin War. Nagatomo was named governor of the newly created Fukuoka Prefecture in 1869. In 1871 the government discovered a counterfeiting operation occurring in the castle grounds with the knowledge of the prefectural government. As a result, Nagatomo was replaced as governor by Prince Arisugawa Taruhito. Nagatomo was made a member of the new nobility in the Meiji period.

Passing on the headship to his son Kuroda Nagashige in 1878, Nagatomo died in Tokyo in 1902, at age 65.

Family
Father: Tōdō Takayuki
Mother: Myojin’in
Foster Father: Kuroda Nagahiro
Wife: Matsudaira Toyoko
Concubines:
 Nakamura-dono
 Iwatani-dono
 Toshiro-dono
 Sumida-dono
 Itakura-dono
 Omiya-dono
 Children:
 Kuroda Nagashige (1867–1939) by Toyoko
 Kuroda Nagatoshi (1881-1944) by Toyoko
 Sadako married Nabeshima Naomitsu by Toyoko
 Junko
 Kuroda Nagaatsu (1885-1963) by Toyoko

Title

References 

1838 births
1902 deaths
Samurai
Daimyo
Meiji Restoration
Kazoku
Kuroda clan
People from Tokyo